Heinrich "Heinz" Pototschnig (June 30, 1923 – April 11, 1995) was an Austrian writer and physician.

Pototschnig was born in Graz. After World War II and after he graduated in medicine, he moved to Carinthia, where he practised in Villach and started writing. His works include narratives, essays, lyric poetry and radio plays. In 1962 he became editor of Der Bogen, which was edited by Hans Leb before.
In 1977 he participated in the first edition of the Ingeborg Bachmann Competition, Klagenfurt. He died in Villach.

Honors
 Theodor Körner Prize, 1965 and 1971
 Peter Rosegger Prize, 1969
 Great golden decoration of Styria, 1984
 Cultural award of Villach, 1994

Works
 Schatten schrägen ins Licht. Gedichte., 1961 (illustrated by Franz Schneeweiß)
 Nachtkupfer, 1962 (illustrated by Heinz Goll)
 Den Rest teilen die Sterne, 1963
 Lotungen. Lyrische Legende für Stimmen., 1965
 Die grünen Schnäbel - Zehn Geschichten über Kinder., 1970
 Die Grenze, 1974
 Die Wanderung, 1976
 Der Sommer mit den Enten, 1977
 Westdrift. Gedichte., 1990
 Aus Spiegeln keine Wiederkehr, 1991
 Sei Stein und allein, 1994
 Nach dem Abschied, 1997

References

External links
 

Austrian male writers
Austrian medical writers
Writers from Graz
1923 births
1995 deaths
Physicians from Graz